Thursday Night Baseball is the de facto branding used for live game telecasts of Major League Baseball on Thursday nights.

History

USA Network Thursday Night Baseball (1979–1983)

From 1979 to 1983, the USA Network broadcast Major League Baseball games under the Thursday Game of the Week banner.

The series began April 26, 1979 with a doubleheader: Cleveland at Kansas City (Jim Woods/Bud Harrelson) followed by Baltimore at California (Monte Moore/Maury Wills). The second game of the night was typically, based out of the West Coast.  The games were usually blacked out of the competing teams' cities. Once in a while, when USA did a repeat of the telecast late at night, local cities were allowed to show the rerun.

From 1980 to 1981, Woods and Nelson Briles (replacing Harrelson) did the early games (except for a game at Montreal on October 2, 1980, which reunited Woods with onetime Boston Red Sox radio partner Ned Martin), while Moore and Wes Parker (replacing Wills) called the late game.

In 1982, doubleheaders did not start until June 17. Prior to the doubleheaders starting, Moore and Parker did the individual game until then. When the doubleheaders finally began, Moore and Parker moved over to the late game for the rest of the year. Meanwhile, Eddie Doucette (replacing Jim Woods) and Nelson Briles were assigned to call the early game.

USA continued with the plan of not starting doubleheaders until June in the final year of the package in 1983. Steve Zabriskie and Al Albert filled in for Eddie Doucette in September 1982 (Steve Grad also occasionally substituted) while Albert replaced Doucette for a game or more in 1983.

ABC's Thursday Night Baseball (1989)

In 1989, the ABC network aired Thursday night Major League Baseball games after having broadcast Monday Night Baseball (and occasional Sunday afternoon games) since 1976. This was ABC's final year of consecutive baseball coverage (teaming with NBC, which had telecast Saturday afternoon games since 1966 and Major League Baseball in general since 1947) due to CBS signing a four-year contract (spanning from 1990 to 1993) to become the exclusive national broadcast network provider for Major League Baseball games.

Al Michaels, Jim Palmer, and Tim McCarver formed ABC's lead broadcast team. Meanwhile, Gary Thorne was the backup play-by-play man alongside Joe Morgan (who had worked with Gary Bender the previous season) on color commentary.

Rumors of Thursday night games on CBS

In 1990, CBS replaced ABC and NBC as the broadcast network television home of Major League Baseball. The proposed deal with CBS involved respectively American League East teams playing the National League East, and the American League West playing the National League West.

In October , when it was a known fact that ABC and NBC were going to end their television deal/joint venture with Major League Baseball, preliminary talks arose about CBS resuming its role as the league's national over-the-air broadcaster. It was rumored that CBS would show Thursday night games (more specifically, a package of West Coast inter-league games scheduled for the 11:30 p.m. Eastern/8:30 Pacific Time slot) while Fox would show Saturday afternoon games. CBS and Fox were also rumored to share rights to the postseason. In the end however, CBS' involvement did not come to pass and NBC became Fox's over-the-air national television partner. Whereas each team earned about $14 million in 1990 under CBS, the later television agreement with NBC and Fox beginning in 1996 earned each team about $6.8 million.

Fox Sports Net and Fox Family's coverage (1997–2001)

In 1997, as part of the contract with Major League Baseball it had signed the year before, Fox Sports gained an additional outlet for its coverage. Its recently launched network of cable regional sports networks, Fox Sports Net, was given rights to two Thursday night games per week, one for the Eastern and Central time zones and one for the Mountain and Pacific time zones.

In 2000, as part of an exclusive contract Fox signed with MLB, that coverage passed to Fox Family Channel and was reduced to one game per week. After the 2000 season, Fox also gained rights to the entire postseason and moved a large portion of its Division Series coverage to Fox Family. This lasted for one season due to The Walt Disney Company acquiring Fox Family. As part of the transaction, Fox Family was renamed ABC Family and ESPN gained the rights to Fox Family and FX's MLB coverage, although the 2002 Division Series aired on ABC Family due to contractual issues, but with ESPN production, a sign of things to come at ABC Sports. Control of the overall contract remained with Fox, meaning they could renegotiate following the 2006 season and not allow ESPN to retain its postseason coverage. For the 2007 season, Fox did exactly that, and TBS became the other home of the postseason as part of its new baseball contract.

Play-by-play announcers for the FSN/Fox Family coverage included Kenny Albert, Thom Brennaman, Chip Caray, Josh Lewin, and Steve Physioc. Color analysts included Bob Brenly, Kevin Kennedy, Steve Lyons, and Jeff Torborg. Occasionally, FSN would simulcast a local-team feed of a game from one of its affiliated RSNs in lieu of a dedicated national production.

ESPN Thursday Night Baseball (consistently: 2003–2006) (select games: 1996, 2002, 2011-2012, 2015, 2017-present)

ESPN Thursday Night Baseball aired on either ESPN or ESPN2 from 2003 to 2006 and featured one game per week, taking over the package that had been on Fox Family Channel. Castrol served as the presenting sponsor for the telecasts.

The play-by-play commentator was Chris Berman along with either Joe Morgan or Eric Karros as color commentator. In 2006, Duke Castiglione joined the broadcast as the field reporter.

ESPN Thursday Night Baseball was officially discontinued after the 2006 season because the broadcast rights to the package were lost to TBS. TBS showed the games on Sunday afternoons that ESPN previously aired on Thursday nights. Thursday Night Baseball was replaced with MLS Primetime Thursday.

Even though Thursday Night Baseball was officially discontinued after the 2006 season, ESPN has still aired select games on Thursday nights. This occurred in 2011, 2012, 2015, and every year since 2017, when Opening Day of the MLB season was moved to Thursdays, as an evening game on Opening Day remains part of ESPN's baseball contract.

MLB Network Showcase (2009-present)

On April 9, 2009, MLB Network aired its first ever self-produced live baseball telecast. The network typically produces 26 non-exclusive live games a year during the regular season; since one or both teams' local TV rights holders also carry the games, the MLB Network feed is subject to local blackouts. In that event, the cities in the blacked-out markets will instead see a simulcast of another scheduled game via one team's local TV rights holder.

For the shortened 2020 season, MLB Network aired 8 games on Thursday nights, mostly simulcasts of regional sports networks.

Fox Sports Thursday Night Baseball (2014–present)

Fox (2019-present)
For the 2019 season, Fox Sports announced that they would air two games on Thursday nights in September. Four Thursday night games were aired on Fox in a regionalized form, with the Atlanta Braves vs. the Philadelphia Phillies and the Los Angeles Dodgers vs. the Baltimore Orioles airing September 12 at 7:15. The following week, the St. Louis Cardinals vs. the Chicago Cubs and the Detroit Tigers vs. the Cleveland Indians were aired. The primary games were called by Joe Davis, John Smoltz, and Ken Rosenthal, while the secondary games were called by Kenny Albert, A. J. Pierzynski, and Jon Morosi in 2019.

With the 2020 season being abbreviated to just 60 games due to the COVID-19 pandemic, Fox announced that they would broadcast at least four games on Thursday nights beginning on July 30 and continuing through the month of August. Fox aired three weekends of Thursday night games in 2020, with July 30 and August 6 being regionalized, while August 13 was a national broadcast for the whole country. Fox was supposed to air another week of regional games on August 27, but they were postponed in the wake of player protest after the police shooting of Jacob Blake in Kenosha, Wisconsin (and instead those games got rescheduled to Saturday which aired as part of the Baseball Night in America package)

For the 2021 season, Fox only aired one Thursday night game. The "Field of Dreams Game" between the New York Yankees and the Chicago White Sox.

For the 2022 season, Fox aired three weeks of Thursday night games, The first aired was the Field of Dreams game on August 11, then it aired games in 2 weeks of September (to avoid College Football).

FS1 (2014–present)
While not weekly FS1 has aired baseball on Thursday nights occasionally since 2014. One game was aired on Thursdays in 2014 and 2015, two games in 2016, one game in 2017 and two games in 2018, three games were aired in 2020 and three games in 2022. FS1 usually airs baseball games on Saturdays.

Schedule

Notes

YouTube (2019-present)

Since 2019, YouTube has aired a select amount of Major League Baseball games. These games are produced by MLB Network but are available exclusively through the MLB YouTube channel. While most games stream on Wednesday afternoons, some games have streamed on Thursdays.

References

External links
Searchable Network TV Broadcasts

ABC Sports
1979 American television series debuts
1983 American television series endings
1989 American television series debuts
1989 American television series endings
2003 American television series debuts
2003 American television series endings
2019 American television series debuts
Major League Baseball on television
Major League Baseball on Fox
USA Network Sports
1990s American television series
2020s American television series
Fox Sports Networks original programming
American Broadcasting Company original programming
ESPN original programming
ESPN2 original programming
Fox Family Channel original programming